is a Japanese former football player. He used his name "若松 賢治" until 1994.

Playing career
Wakamatsu was born in Kagoshima Prefecture on August 16, 1972. After dropping out of Fukuoka University, he joined Sanfrecce Hiroshima in 1993. He played in the 1993 J.League Cup as forward instead Takuya Takagi, because Takagi had left the club to play for the Japanese national team. However, he was unable to play in any other games and he retired  at the end of the 1995 season.

Club statistics

References

External links

Profile at biglobe.ne.jp

1972 births
Living people
Fukuoka University alumni
Association football people from Kagoshima Prefecture
Japanese footballers
J1 League players
Sanfrecce Hiroshima players
Association football forwards